Ali Mahmoud Al Saadi (born 20 April 1986) is a Lebanese footballer who plays as a centre-back for  club Safa.

Starting his career at Safa in 2005, Al Saadi remained there until 2017—albeit being sent on a six-month loan to Naft Maysan in Iraq. In 2017 he moved to Ahed for one season, before returning to Safa the following year. In 2019 Al Saadi moved to Nejmeh, then returned to Safa a second time in 2022.

Making his international debut for Lebanon in 2006, Al Saadi represented his nation in 46 games, scoring six goals in the process. As he was involved in the 2013 match-fixing scandal, Al Saadi was permanently excluded from the national team.

Club career 
Al Saadi began his senior career at Lebanese Premier League side Safa, during the 2005–06 season. He was part of the team that reached the 2008 AFC Cup Final where, despite Al Saadi scored in the second leg, Safa lost 10–5 on aggregate against Al-Muharraq. He helped his side win two league titles in a row, in 2011–12 and 2012–13, a Lebanese FA Cup, in 2012–13, two Lebanese Elite Cups, in 2009 and 2012, and a Lebanese Super Cup, in 2013.

In 2014 Al Saadi moved on a six-month loan to Iraqi Premier League side Naft Maysan, scoring one goal. Upon his return on loan, Al Saadi helped Safa win the 2015–16 Lebanese Premier League. On 7 July 2017, Al Saadi joined Ahed after 18 years at Safa. In his only season at Ahed (2017–18), Al Saadi won the league, FA Cup, and Super Cup.

In 2018 Al Saadi moved back to Safa, where he stayed for one season (2018–19). On 9 August 2019, the centre-back moved to Nejmeh, in a swap deal that included Hussein Sharafeddine and Ahmed Jalloul. Al Saadi returned to Safa once again in August 2022.

International career
In 2007, Al Saadi played for the Lebanon national under-23 team at the 2008 Olympics qualifiers.

He participated in the Nehru Cup as part of the Lebanon national team and scored the winning goal in the opening match against India, defeating India 1–0. Additionally, he is known for giving Lebanon the early lead against South Korea in the 4th minute, in order to help his team earn their first victory against them in a FIFA-sanctioned competition.

He is one of 24 players involved to the 2013 match-fixing scandal, and suffered one season ban from club football, and a lifetime suspension from the national team.

Career statistics

International

Honours 
Safa
 Lebanese Premier League: 2011–12, 2012–13, 2015–16
 Lebanese FA Cup: 2012–13; runner-up: 2020–21
 Lebanese Elite Cup: 2009, 2012
 Lebanese Super Cup: 2013
 AFC Cup runner-up: 2008

Nejmeh
 Lebanese FA Cup: 2021–22
 Lebanese Elite Cup: 2021
 Lebanese Super Cup runner-up: 2021

Individual
 Lebanese Premier League Team of the Season: 2005–06, 2006–07, 2007–08, 2008–09, 2010–11, 2011–12, 2015–16

See also
 List of Lebanon international footballers

References

External links

 
 
 
 Ali Al Saadi at RSSSF
 
 

1986 births
Living people
Lebanese footballers
Lebanon international footballers
Lebanese expatriate footballers
Lebanese expatriate sportspeople in Iraq
Expatriate footballers in Iraq
Safa SC players
Al Ahed FC players
Nejmeh SC players
Lebanese Premier League players
Association football central defenders
Footballers from Beirut
Lebanon youth international footballers
Iraqi Premier League players
Naft Maysan FC players